Chen Qihan (24 August 1897 – 19 June 1981) was a general in the People's Liberation Army of China.

Biography
Chen was born in Xingguo, Jiangxi, on 24 August 1897. He secretly joined the Chinese Communist Party in 1925.

In October 1930, Chen became the head of Teaching regiment of Red Third Army. Shortly he became the chief of staff in Red Fourth Army, and later chief of staff in Red Third Army. In March 1932, he became the chief of staff in Red First Army Group.

After 1943, he studied at the Central Party School of the Chinese Communist Party.

In 1945, he became the vice commander of Hebei-Rehe-Liaoning Military Region, and went to Northeast. In winter of 1947, he was the vice commander of Dongman (Jilin) Military Region. In summer of 1948, he became commander of Liaoning Military Region. After Liaoshen campaign, he became the chief of staff in Northeast Military Region.

In May 1949, he was appointed as the commander of Jiangxi Military Region, and in 1952 became the chairman of Jiangxi Political Consultative Conference.

He was made a general in 1955.

He died on 19 June 1981 in Beijing.

References

1897 births
1981 deaths
People's Liberation Army generals from Jiangxi
Hakka generals
Politicians from Ganzhou
People from Xingguo County
Chinese Communist Party politicians from Jiangxi
People's Republic of China politicians from Jiangxi